Alessandro Vittrici (or Vittrice; died 5 October 1650) was a Roman art collector and Catholic prelate who served as Bishop of Alatri (1632–1648) and as governor of Rome from 1647.

Biography
Alessandro was the son of Gerolamo Vittrici (died March 1612), sottoguardaroba to every pope since Gregory XIII. Gerolamo commissioned the Deposition of Christ from Caravaggio for his uncle's chapel (the Capella della Pietà) in Santa Maria in Vallicella (the Chiesa Nuova), a church built for the Oratory of Saint Philip Neri.

Vittrice is also known to have been, in 1620, the owner of Caravaggio's The Fortune Teller, which he gifted to Pope Innocent X.

On 20 September 1632, Alessandro Vittrici was appointed during the papacy of Pope Urban VIII as Bishop of Alatri.
On 24 October 1632, he was consecrated bishop by Laudivio Zacchia, Cardinal-Priest of San Pietro in Vincoli. 
He served as Bishop of Alatri until his resignation in 1648. 
He died on 5 October 1650.

Episcopal succession
While bishop, he was the principal co-consecrator:

References

External links and additional sources
 (for Chronology of Bishops) 
 (for Chronology of Bishops)  

Italian art collectors
17th-century Italian Roman Catholic bishops
Bishops appointed by Pope Urban VIII
1650 deaths